Emer O'Brien (born 1972) is an installation artist with a background in photography, she was born in Dublin and raised in Toronto. Since 1998 she has lived and worked in London.

She studied at London College of Fashion, London (1999–2001) and then at Reading College of Art and Design (2001–2002) and graduated with a BA (Hons) from Oxford Brookes University (2002). She then completed her MA at Goldsmiths, University London (2002– 2003).

O'Brien is best known for works that mediate on the redundancy of human artefacts when deserted by man.

Her recent large-scale installations like Run Run Run at the Wapping Project chart the intersection of technology and science with the natural and supernatural.

O'Brien is also known for her photographs of horses.
In 2004 O'Briens work was featured in The East End Academy exhibition at the Whitechapel Gallery.
In 2008 O'Brien's work was selected by Humphrey Ocean for the Royal Academy Summer Exhibition.

References

External links 
www.emerobrien.com

1974 births
Living people
Irish contemporary artists
Artists from Toronto
Artists from London